The 2019–20 Slovenian PrvaLiga was the 29th edition of the Slovenian PrvaLiga since its establishment in 1991. The season began on 13 July 2019 and was scheduled to end on 15 May 2020. The league was halted on 12 March 2020 due to COVID-19 pandemic in Slovenia, and later resumed on 15 June 2020. Celje won their first-ever league title and earned a place in the first qualifying round of the 2020–21 UEFA Champions League.

Maribor were the defending champions.

Competition format
Each team played 36 matches (18 home and 18 away). Teams played four matches against each other (2 home and 2 away).

Teams
Gorica and Krško were relegated at the end of the previous season. Bravo and Tabor Sežana joined the other eight teams in the league this season after earning promotion from the Slovenian Second League.

Stadiums and locations
Seating capacity only; some stadiums also have standing areas.

Personnel and kits

Managerial changes

League table

Results

First half of the season

Second half of the season

PrvaLiga play-off
A two-legged play-off between the ninth-placed team from the PrvaLiga and the second-placed team from the 2019–20 Slovenian Second League was played. The winner earned a place in the 2020–21 PrvaLiga season.

Gorica won 6–1 on aggregate.

Season statistics

Top goalscorers

Source: PrvaLiga official website

Top assists

Source: PrvaLiga official website

Awards

Annual awards
PrvaLiga Player of the Season
Mitja Lotrič

PrvaLiga U23 Player of the Season
Dario Vizinger

PrvaLiga Coach of the Season
Dušan Kosič

PrvaLiga Team of the Season

See also
2019–20 Slovenian Football Cup
2019–20 Slovenian Second League

Notes
 All matches after March 2020 were played either behind closed doors or with significantly reduced capacity due to the COVID-19 pandemic in Slovenia.

References

External links
 
Soccerway.com

Slovenian PrvaLiga seasons
Slovenia
1
Slovenian PrvaLiga